Frederick Vincent Paine Jr. (December 7, 1925 – October 26, 2004) was an American professional basketball player. He spent one season in the Basketball Association of America (BAA) as a member of the Providence Steamrollers (1948–49). He attended Westminster College of Pennsylvania.

BAA career statistics

Regular season

External links
 

1925 births
2004 deaths
American men's basketball players
Basketball players from Pennsylvania
Forwards (basketball)
Providence Steamrollers players
Westminster Titans men's basketball players